Eclipse is the third album by George Lewis Jr., released under his stage name, Twin Shadow. Lewis produced the album himself.

Reception

The album was received with generally positive reviews. The song "To the Top" was chosen to be used in two major projects, the film Paper Towns and the fourth episode of the episodic video game Tales from the Borderlands by Telltale Games, while "Old Love / New Love" was created and used for the video game Grand Theft Auto V.

Track listing

Personnel
 George Lewis Jr. – vocals, production

Charts

References

2015 albums
Twin Shadow albums
Warner Music Group albums